Club Universitario de Buenos Aires, commonly known for its acronym CUBA, is an Argentine sports club with headquarters in the autonomous city of Buenos Aires. Universitario hosts the practise of a large variety of sports and activities, including aikido, mountaineering, basketball, boxing, scuba diving, fencing, skiing, football, gymnastics, artistic gymnastics, golf, field hockey, judo, swimming, yachting, paddle tennis, basque pelota, rugby union, squash, taekwondo, tennis, volleyball, windsurf and yoga.

One of the sports the club had gained more recognition is rugby union, which senior team currently plays in Top 12, the first division of the Unión de Rugby de Buenos Aires league system. "CUBA" has won 14 first division titles to date.

History 
The Club was founded on May 11, 1918, by a group of university students as a means of fostering camaraderie in a politics-free environment. The main request to become a member was to be a university student. In 1917, after a basketball game played in the Young Christian Association -which ended in a riot act- some of its members were punished. Many of those members would establish the club one year later. The first president of the institution was Dr. Carlos P.Waldorp.

On 31 October 1918, the club acquired a house on Viamonte street of Buenos Aires, which would be the headquarters of Universitario. From 1933 to 1948 (when Universitario acquired land in Villa de Mayo district of Greater Buenos Aires), the club hosted its activities at the club Obras Sanitarias.

Rugby union 

It is believed that rugby union began to be practiced at the club because of the friendship between members of Club Atlético San Isidro and the founders of CUBA. Furthermore, the first CUBA captain was Oscar Mena that had previously played in San Isidro. He arrived at the club not only to play but to serve as a coach of junior divisions.

Universitario registered its rugby team with Unión del Rugby del Río de la Plata (today Argentine Rugby Union) in 1919. At the beginning the team only played friendly matches, debuting against Lomas with a victory of 16–3. Universitario would they play San Isidro, Belgrano AC and Lomas again.

Universitario started to take part in official competitions in 1922, playing at the Unión de Rugby de Buenos Aires second division. The first official game was on May 15, 1921, when "CUBA" defeated Huemac by 11–0 in the Club Metropolitan field sited in Santos Lugares. Universitario won the championship without being defeated, therefore promoting to the top division of Argentine rugby. Only two players of that team had experience in playing rugby, Julio Dellepiane  Rawson and Rodolfo de Surra (that had played in San Isidro and Eastbourne College of England, respectively).

First championship 

Universitario won its first title in the first division in 1931. The team won 14 of 16 games, with a loss (to current champion San Isidro by 25–0 with 7 tries conceded) and 1 game drew (against Gimnasia y Esgrima de Buenos Aires). Universitario scored 213 points (43 tries), receiving 77.

Universitario recovered from the thrashing defeat by San Isidro, making a great campaign and winning all the games of the second round, including a victory against San Isidro by 12–6, taking revenge from the first-round game.

At the international level, Universitario played several matches against teams outside Argentina, such as the Junior Springboks in 1932 and 1959, an Oxford & Cambridge combined team in 1948, 1956 and 1965, the Ireland national side in 1952 and the "Gazelles" from South Africa in 1966. Nevertheless, the most significant achievement for the club was in 1965 when Universitario won the title in all divisions (First to fifth, including reserve teams).

Return to glory 
Forty-three years had to pass before Universitario won a new title in 2013. In 2006 and 2007 the team reached the semi-finals and was near to be relegated in 2010 and 2011. That same year Universitario had to play a match against Lomas to remain in the top division.

In 2013 Universitario won its 14th championship, defeating Hindú by 11–9 in San Isidro. That same year Universitario became the national champion when winning the Nacional de Clubes after defeating Rosarian team Duendes by 21–20 at a final match played in Villa de Mayo.

Notable rugby union players 

 Frank Chevallier Boutell
 Ignacio Corleto
 Ernesto Ure 
 Hugo Miguens 
 Bernardo Miguens 
 Javier Miguens 
 Pedro Lanza 
 Juan Lanza 
 Elías Gaviña 
 Ricardo Mastai 
 Felipe Aranguren 
 Benjamín Urdapilleta
 Tomás de la Vega
 Facundo Bosch
 Matías Moroni
 Che Guevara

Notable members 
 Natalio Botana 
 Alfredo Davicce 
 Fernando de la Rúa
 Eduardo Pavlovsky 
 Lino Palacio
 Rolando Hanglin
 'Che' Guevara

Locations 

At present, CUBA has many branches disseminated over Argentina:

 Headquarters, known among members as "Viamonte", due to its address, 1560 Viamonte Street, located in the neighborhood known as "Tribunales", this term meaning "courts" in Spanish.
 Palermo, in the park section of that quarter, on Avenida Figueroa Alcorta. The land had been occupied by a dependence of Argentine Air Force until October 1963, when the Government of Buenos Aires donated it to the club.
 Núñez, located in the homonymous neighbourhood, was opened in 1959.
 Villa de Mayo, in Malvinas Argentinas Partido, Greater Buenos Aires, approximately  30 km NW of the city of Buenos Aires. CUBA settled there after the club had to leave its facilities in Palermo, Buenos Aires, which belonged to Club Obras Sanitarias.
 Cabaña El Arbolito (Little Tree Cabin), located near Nahuel Huapi Lake, 80 km of Bariloche. That land was donated by the Government of Argentina in 1931.
 Catedral, placed in the major tourism centre of Bariloche.
 Fátima, sited in the homonymous city of the Pilar Partido. This branch was built due to the increasing number of members needing another place to play golf. Facilities (located in a gated community) were definitely finished in 1991.

Uniforms

Controversy 
Universitario has always been a Gentlemen's club. Women are considered adherent members. As adherents, women are excluded from decision-making processes and their access to the main headquarters (on Viamonte street) is restricted: women only have access to the restaurant and the library. The sports practised there are exclusively for men. Nevertheless, the statute of Universitario (written in 1921) does not mention that women are not allowed in the club.

If a member dies, the adherents (his wife or daughter) only can access to the club with a special permission granted by the committee. In case a member get a divorce, adherents are banned from the club definitely.

The committee of Club Universitario interprets that the word "member" does not apply to women so they only can be adherent or relatives.

Because of women can not taking active part in the club, then President of Argentina Juan Domingo Perón took over the club in 1953.

The club has also been accused of supporting several de facto governments of Argentina. In the official history of the club it was stated that "The government of Gral. Pedro Aramburu repaired the abuse committed" In 1968, some members of the committee celebrated the 50th anniversary of the club with members of the military government leadered by dictator Juan Carlos Onganía.

Honours

Basketball 
Copa E.W. O'Farell (1): 1927
Torneo Nacional (3): 1934, 1940, 1944

Rugby union 
Torneo de la URBA (15): 1931, 1942, 1944, 1945, 1947, 1949, 1950, 1951, 1952, 1965, 1968, 1969, 1970, 2013, 2021
Nacional de Clubes (1): 2014

Notes

References

External links 

 
 Universidad de Buenos Aires website

U
u
U
Diving clubs
U
U
U
 
U
Yacht clubs in Argentina